"Heavy Is the Crown" is a song by American rock band Daughtry. It was released on March 18, 2021, as the second single from the band's sixth studio album, Dearly Beloved. It is written by Chris Daughtry, Johnny Cummings, Elvio Fernandes, Scott Stevens and Marti Frederiksen. With a peak of number four, it is Daughtry's highest-charting single on the Mainstream Rock chart.

Charts

Release history

References

2021 singles
2021 songs
Daughtry (band) songs
Songs written by Chris Daughtry
Songs written by Marti Frederiksen
Songs written by Scott Stevens (singer)